Jean-Marie Aerts (Zeebrugge (Bruges), 25 May 1951) is a Belgian guitarist and producer, best known as the guitar player for TC Matic. Aerts was a session musician who had worked with Kaz Lux, Raymond van het Groenewoud, and Plastic Bertrand when he joined Arno Hintjens in TC Matic in 1980, replacing Paul Decoutere. He also produced the band's first three albums; during his tenure with the band he produced other artists' albums as well, including Luc van Acker's KAZ (1982) and Arbeid Adelt!'s ''Jonge Helden (1983). After TC Matic broke up he continued as a producer, working with artists including DJ DNA, Jo Lemaire, and the Urban Dance Squad, for whom he produced the groundbreaking debut album Mental Floss for the Globe.

References

External links
Aerts' website 

Living people
1951 births
Belgian male guitarists
Belgian record producers